Gustav August Adam Flor ( – ) was a Baltic German zoologist from Livonia.

Life and career
Flor studied medicine and natural science at the University of Dorpat, later becoming a professor of zoology. In 1860, he became director of the zoological cabinet, which he remained until his death in 1883 (the zoological cabinet was the predecessor of the Zoology Museum at the University of Tartu, where his 11,815-specimen entomological collection still resides).

He is best known for his studies of Hemiptera, especially the two-volume work Die Rhynchoten Livlands in systematischer Folge beschrieben ("The Hemiptera of Livonia, Described In Systematic Order").

Works
 Rhynchotorum Livonicorum descriptio Flor's 1856 thesis (Latin:"Description of Livonian Hemiptera")
 Die Rhynchoten Livlands in systematischer Folge beschrieben, v.1 (1860) (German)
 Die Rhynchoten Livlands in systematischer Folge beschrieben, v.2 (1861) (German)

See also
 List of Baltic German scientists

References

1829 births
1883 deaths
People from Limbaži Municipality
People from Kreis Wolmar
Baltic-German people
German entomologists
University of Tartu alumni
Academic staff of the University of Tartu